The 1997–98 Connecticut Huskies men's basketball team represented the University of Connecticut in the 1997–98 collegiate men's basketball season. The Huskies completed the season with a 32–5 overall record. The Huskies were members of the Big East Conference where they finished with a 15–3 record. They made it to the Elite Eight in the 1998 NCAA Division I men's basketball tournament. The Huskies played their home games at Harry A. Gampel Pavilion in Storrs, Connecticut and the Hartford Civic Center in Hartford, Connecticut, and they were led by twelfth-year head coach Jim Calhoun.

Roster
Listed are the student athletes who were members of the 1997–1998 team.

Schedule 

|-
!colspan=12 style=""| Regular Season

|-
!colspan=12 style=""| Big East tournament

|-
!colspan=12 style=""| NCAA tournament

Schedule Source:

Rankings

References 

UConn Huskies men's basketball seasons
Connecticut Huskies
Connecticut Huskies
1997 in sports in Connecticut
1998 in sports in Connecticut